The abc conjecture (also known as the Oesterlé–Masser conjecture) is a conjecture in number theory that arose out of a discussion of Joseph Oesterlé and David Masser in 1985. It is stated in terms of three positive integers a, b and c (hence the name) that are relatively prime and satisfy a + b = c.  The conjecture essentially states that the product of the distinct prime factors of abc is usually not much smaller than c.  A number of famous conjectures and theorems in number theory would follow immediately from the abc conjecture or its versions.  Mathematician  Dorian Goldfeld described the abc conjecture as "The most important unsolved problem in Diophantine analysis".

The abc conjecture originated as the outcome of attempts by Oesterlé and Masser to understand the Szpiro conjecture about elliptic curves, which involves more geometric structures in its statement than the abc conjecture. The abc conjecture was shown to be equivalent to the modified Szpiro's conjecture.

Various attempts to prove the abc conjecture have been made, but none are currently accepted by the mainstream mathematical community and as of 2020, the conjecture is still regarded as unproven.

Formulations
Before stating the conjecture, the notion of the  radical of an integer must be introduced: for a positive integer n, the radical of n, denoted rad(n), is the product of the distinct prime factors of n. For example

If a, b, and c are coprime positive integers such that a + b = c, it turns out that "usually" c < rad(abc). The abc conjecture deals with the exceptions. Specifically, it states that:

An equivalent formulation is:

Equivalently (using the little o notation):

A fourth equivalent formulation of the conjecture involves the quality q(a, b, c) of the triple (a, b, c), which is defined as

For example:

A typical triple (a, b, c) of coprime positive integers with a + b = c will have c < rad(abc), i.e. q(a, b, c) < 1. Triples with q > 1 such as in the second example are rather special, they consist of numbers divisible by high powers of small prime numbers. The third formulation is:

Whereas it is known that there are infinitely many triples (a, b, c) of coprime positive integers with a + b = c such that q(a, b, c) > 1, the conjecture predicts that only finitely many of those have q > 1.01 or q > 1.001 or even q > 1.0001, etc. In particular, if the conjecture is true, then there must exist a triple (a, b, c) that achieves the maximal possible quality q(a, b, c).

Examples of triples with small radical
The condition that ε > 0 is necessary as there exist infinitely many triples a, b, c with c > rad(abc). For example, let

The integer b is divisible by 9:

Using this fact, the following calculation is made:

By replacing the exponent 6n by other exponents forcing b to have larger square factors, the ratio between the radical and c can be made arbitrarily small. Specifically, let p > 2 be a prime and consider

Now it may be plausibly claimed that b is divisible by p2:

The last step uses the fact that p2 divides 2p(p−1) − 1. This follows from Fermat's little theorem, which shows that, for p > 2, 2p−1 = pk + 1 for some integer k. Raising both sides to the power of p then shows that 2p(p−1) = p2(...) + 1.

And now with a similar calculation as above, the following results:

A list of the highest-quality triples (triples with a particularly small radical relative to c) is given below; the highest quality, 1.6299, was found by Eric Reyssat  for

Some consequences

The abc conjecture has a large number of consequences. These include both known results (some of which have been proven separately only since the conjecture has been stated) and conjectures for which it gives a conditional proof. The consequences include:

 Roth's theorem on Diophantine approximation of algebraic numbers.
 The Mordell conjecture (already proven in general by Gerd Faltings).
 As equivalent, Vojta's conjecture in dimension 1.
 The Erdős–Woods conjecture allowing for a finite number of counterexamples.
 The existence of infinitely many non-Wieferich primes in every base b > 1.
 The weak form of Marshall Hall's conjecture on the separation between squares and cubes of integers.
 Fermat's Last Theorem has a famously difficult proof by Andrew Wiles. The abc conjecture says the lim sup of the set of all qualities (defined above) is 1, which implies the much weaker assertion that there is a finite upper bound for qualities.
 The Fermat–Catalan conjecture, a generalization of Fermat's Last Theorem concerning powers that are sums of powers.
 The L-function L(s, χd) formed with the Legendre symbol, has no Siegel zero, given a uniform version of the abc conjecture in number fields, not just the abc conjecture as formulated above for rational integers.
 A polynomial P(x) has only finitely many perfect powers for all integers x if P has at least three simple zeros.
 A generalization of Tijdeman's theorem concerning the number of solutions of ym = xn + k (Tijdeman's theorem answers the case k = 1), and Pillai's conjecture (1931) concerning the number of solutions of Aym = Bxn + k.
 As equivalent, the Granville–Langevin conjecture, that if f is a square-free binary form of degree n > 2, then for every real β > 2 there is a constant C(f, β) such that for all coprime integers x, y, the radical of f(x, y) exceeds C · max{|x|, |y|}n−β.
 As equivalent, the modified Szpiro conjecture, which would yield a bound of rad(abc)1.2+ε.
  has shown that the abc conjecture implies that the Diophantine equation n! + A = k2 has only finitely many solutions for any given integer A.
 There are ~cfN positive integers n ≤ N for which f(n)/B' is square-free, with cf > 0 a positive constant defined as:
The Beal conjecture, a generalization of Fermat's Last Theorem proposing that if A, B, C, x, y, and z are positive integers with Ax + By = Cz and x, y, z > 2, then A, B, and C have a common prime factor. The abc conjecture would imply that there are only finitely many counterexamples.
Lang's conjecture, a lower bound for the height of a non-torsion rational point of an elliptic curve.
 A negative solution to the Erdős–Ulam problem on dense sets of Euclidean points with rational distances.
 An effective version of Siegel's theorem about integral points on algebraic curves.

Theoretical results
The abc conjecture implies that c can be bounded above by a near-linear function of the radical of abc. Bounds are known that are exponential. Specifically, the following bounds have been proven:

In these bounds, K1 and K3 are constants that do not depend on a, b, or c, and K2 is a constant that depends on ε (in an effectively computable way) but not on a, b, or c. The bounds apply to any triple for which c > 2.

There are also theoretical results that provide a lower bound on the best possible form of the abc conjecture.  In particular,  showed that there are infinitely many triples (a, b, c) of coprime integers with a + b = c and

for all k < 4.

Computational results
In 2006, the Mathematics Department of Leiden University in the Netherlands, together with the Dutch Kennislink science institute, launched the ABC@Home project, a grid computing system, which aims to discover additional triples a, b, c with rad(abc) < c. Although no finite set of examples or counterexamples can resolve the abc conjecture, it is hoped that patterns in the triples discovered by this project will lead to insights about the conjecture and about number theory more generally.

As of May 2014, ABC@Home had found 23.8 million triples.

Note: the quality q(a, b, c) of the triple (a, b, c) is defined above.

Refined forms, generalizations and related statements
The abc conjecture is an integer analogue of the Mason–Stothers theorem for polynomials.

where ω is the total number of distinct primes dividing a, b and c.

Andrew Granville noticed that the minimum of the function  over  occurs when 

This inspired  to propose a sharper form of the abc conjecture, namely:

with κ an absolute constant. This version is called the "explicit abc conjecture".

 also describes related conjectures of Andrew Granville that would give upper bounds on c of the form

where Ω(n) is the total number of prime factors of n, and

where Θ(n) is the number of integers up to n divisible only by primes dividing n.

Let k = rad(abc). They conjectured there is a constant C1 such that

holds whereas there is a constant C2 such that

holds infinitely often.

 formulated the n conjecture—a version of the abc conjecture involving n > 2 integers.

Claimed proofs

Lucien Szpiro proposed a solution in 2007, but it was found to be incorrect shortly afterwards.

Since August 2012, Shinichi Mochizuki has claimed a proof of Szpiro's conjecture and therefore the abc conjecture. He released a series of four preprints developing a new theory he called inter-universal Teichmüller theory (IUTT), which is then applied to prove the abc conjecture.
The papers have not been accepted by the mathematical community as providing a proof of abc. This is not only because of their length and the difficulty of understanding them, but also because at least one specific point in the argument has been identified as a gap by some other experts. Although a few mathematicians have vouched for the correctness of the proof, and have attempted to communicate their understanding via workshops on IUTT, they have failed to convince the number theory community at large.

In March 2018, Peter Scholze and Jakob Stix visited  Kyoto for discussions with Mochizuki.
While they did not resolve the differences, they brought them into clearer focus.
Scholze and Stix wrote a report asserting and explaining an error in the logic of the proof and claiming that the resulting gap was "so severe that ... small modifications will not rescue the proof strategy";
Mochizuki claimed that they misunderstood vital aspects of the theory and made invalid simplifications. 

On April 3, 2020, two mathematicians from the Kyoto research institute where Mochizuki works announced that his claimed proof would be published in Publications of the Research Institute for Mathematical Sciences, the institute's journal.  Mochizuki is chief editor of the journal but recused himself from the review of the paper. The announcement was received with skepticism by Kiran Kedlaya and Edward Frenkel, as well as being described by Nature as "unlikely to move many researchers over to Mochizuki's camp". In March 2021, Mochizuki's proof was published in RIMS.

See also
List of unsolved problems in mathematics

Notes

References

Sources

External links
 ABC@home Distributed computing project called ABC@Home.
 Easy as ABC: Easy to follow, detailed explanation by Brian Hayes.
 
 Abderrahmane Nitaj's ABC conjecture home page
 Bart de Smit's ABC Triples webpage
 http://www.math.columbia.edu/~goldfeld/ABC-Conjecture.pdf
 The ABC's of Number Theory by Noam D. Elkies
 Questions about Number by Barry Mazur
 Philosophy behind Mochizuki’s work on the ABC conjecture on MathOverflow
 ABC Conjecture Polymath project wiki page linking to various sources of commentary on Mochizuki's papers.
 abc Conjecture Numberphile video
 News about IUT by Mochizuki

Conjectures
Unsolved problems in number theory
1985 introductions
Number theory